George Malcolm Thomson (2 October 1848 – 25 August 1933) was a New Zealand scientist, educationalist, social worker and politician.

Biography

Born on 2 October 1848 in Calcutta, Thomson grew up in Scotland, being educated at the Edinburgh High School and the University of Edinburgh. At the age of 20, he emigrated to New Zealand, and, apart from a short period farming at Mabel Bush, Southland, spent the rest of his life in Dunedin. He was said to "know his Dunedin like a book".

Thomson's scientific interests were wide, including fisheries, crustaceans and the naturalisation of species. Thomson was one of the first scientists to recognise the potential for invasive species to be introduced via ship's ballast. He helped establish the Portobello Marine Laboratory in 1904.

Thomson was President of the Royal Society of New Zealand between 1907 and 1909; preceded by James Hector and followed by Augustus Hamilton.

Thomson died in Dunedin on 25 August 1933.

References

1848 births
1933 deaths
Scientists from Kolkata
Scottish emigrants to New Zealand
Alumni of the University of Edinburgh
Scientists from Dunedin
New Zealand biologists
Reform Party (New Zealand) MPs
Members of the New Zealand Legislative Council
Reform Party (New Zealand) MLCs
New Zealand MPs for Dunedin electorates
Members of the New Zealand House of Representatives
Unsuccessful candidates in the 1914 New Zealand general election
Presidents of the Royal Society of New Zealand
20th-century New Zealand scientists